The Treaty of Paris was signed on 27 June 1900 between representatives of the Kingdom of Spain and the French Third Republic. The treaty delimited the borders of the Spanish colonies in the Sahara desert (Río de Oro, part of Spanish Sahara) and Equatorial Africa (Spanish Guinea) with respect to the adjoining French colonies on Africa.

History 
Based on the terms of the treaty, Río Muni was relieved of all conflicting claims. Spain was left with a mere 26,000 km2 out of the 300,000 stretching east to the Ubangi River which they initially claimed. Moreover, the treaty granted the French the right to pre-emptively seize all territories if Spain decided to abandon its possessions in Río Muni.

Gallery

See also 
 Río Muni
 Equatorial Guinea
 History of Equatorial Guinea
 Spanish Empire
 Spanish Africa

References

External links
 Cameroon-Chad Boundary

1900 in France
Borders of Equatorial Guinea
Treaties concluded in 1900
Paris (1900)
Paris (1900)
France–Spain relations
1900 in Paris
History of Equatorial Guinea
June 1900 events